German submarine U-15 was a Type IIB U-boat of the Kriegsmarine. It was commissioned on 7 March 1936, following construction at the Deutsche Werke shipyards at Kiel. Its first commander was Werner von Schmidt. In its career, it completed five patrols, all while serving under the 1st U-boat Flotilla. It sank three ships.

Design
German Type IIB submarines were enlarged versions of the original Type IIs. U-15 had a displacement of  when at the surface and  while submerged. She had two shafts and two  propellers.

U-15 was fitted with three  torpedo tubes at the bow, five torpedoes or up to twelve Type A torpedo mines, and a  anti-aircraft gun. The boat had a complement of twentyfive.

Fate
On 30 January 1940, U-15 was sunk in the North Sea in the Hoofden, after being rammed by accident by the German torpedo boat Iltis. 25 men died; there were no survivors.

Summary of raiding history

References

Bibliography

External links

German Type II submarines
U-boats commissioned in 1936
U-boats sunk in 1940
World War II submarines of Germany
World War II shipwrecks in the North Sea
U-boats sunk by German warships
1936 ships
U-boats sunk in collisions
Ships built in Kiel
U-boat accidents
Ships lost with all hands
Maritime incidents in January 1940